Jafarabad (also Romanized as Ja‘farābād; also known as Dzhaffarabad) is a village in Belesbeneh Rural District, Kuchesfahan District, Rasht County, Gilan Province, Iran. At the 2006 census, its population consists of 948 people, in 264 families.

References 

Populated places in Rasht County